Michael Joseph Sullivan (March 10, 1860 – June 16, 1929) was a Major League Baseball player. He appeared in 28 games for the Philadelphia Athletics of the American Association, mostly in the outfield.

Sources

Major League Baseball outfielders
Philadelphia Athletics (AA) players
Meriden Maroons players
Hartford Dark Blues (minor league) players
Syracuse Stars (minor league baseball) players
Baseball players from Massachusetts
People from Webster, Massachusetts
1860 births
1929 deaths
19th-century baseball players
Sportspeople from Worcester County, Massachusetts